was a Japanese actor.

Biography
He began acting at the Yoshi Hijikatas theatre Company after dropping out of Nihon University. Kusanagi made his film debut in 1953 in Yoake Mae directed by Kōzaburō Yoshimura. In 1956, he starred in Darkness at Noon, which was based on the true story of an innocent man arrested, tried and executed for a crime he didn't commit. Kusanagi appeared in over 40 films, mostly in supporting roles, in films such as Alone on the Pacific, The Sun, Bee Bop High School, and The Man Who Stole the Sun.

Kusanagi died of pneumonia on November 11, 2007, aged 78.

Selected filmography

Film
 Darkness at Noon (Mahiru no ankoku) (1956)
 Kurenai no Kenju (1961) - Chen
 Alone on the Pacific, also known as Alone Across the Pacific (1963)
 Kaerazaru hibi (1978)
 Taiyō o Nusunda Otoko, also known as The Man Who Stole the Sun (1979)
 Onna no Hosomichi: Nureta Kaikyo (1980)
 Tōki Rakujitsu (1992)
 Madadayo (1993)
 Utatama (2008)

Television
Taiga dramas
 Ryōma ga Yuku (1968), Kiyokawa Hachirō
 Momi no Ki wa Nokotta (1970), Shirōemon
 Haru no Sakamichi (1971), Konishi Yukinaga
 Shin Heike Monogatari (1972)
 Katsu Kaishū (1974)
 Genroku Taiheiki (1975)
 Kashin (1977)
 Kusa Moeru (1979)
 Oretachi wa Tenshi da! (1979),Jiro Murata Episode7
 Tōge no Gunzō (1982)
 Taiheiki (1991)
 Homura Tatsu (1993)
 Hana no Ran (1994)
 Mōri Motonari (1997), Kikkawa Kunitsune
 Ultraman Taro (1973)
 Naruto Hichō (1977–78)
 Sanada Taiheiki (1985–86), Oda Nobukatsu
 Kumokiri Nizaemon (1995)
 Gokenin Zankurō (1997)

Awards

References

External links

1929 births
2007 deaths
Japanese male film actors
People from Tokyo
Deaths from pneumonia in Japan
Place of birth missing